José Felipe Beltran (born December 9, 1981) is an American bare-knuckle fighter and mixed martial artist. A professional mixed martial artist since 2007, he has competed for the UFC, Bellator, Strikeforce, and King of the Cage. He also competed in the Bare Knuckle Fighting Championship where he was  the former BKFC Heavyweight Champion.

Background
Beltran was born in Oceanside, California and raised in Carlsbad, California by a single mother. He has an older sister. Beltran began boxing when he was 10 years old, and also was involved in street fighting from a young age. Beltran also began wrestling in middle school and was talented, but was initially not allowed to compete outside of practice because of poor grades and was eventually kicked out from the junior high. Beltran continued wrestling at Carlsbad High School during his sophomore year and picked up his grades, going on to compete on the varsity team as a Heavyweight for all three years and also became involved in Greco-Roman Wrestling. Beltran originally attended Palomar College, and after two years he academically transferred to the University of Hawaii at Manoa. During the first semester, Beltran was introduced to mixed martial arts at a local gym, Bulls Pen. After the semester, Beltran moved back to California, attending MiraCosta College for a spell before dropping out in pursuit of a career in mixed martial arts. When he began training, Beltran weighed 300 lbs.

Mixed martial arts career

Early career
Beltran made his professional debut on February 10, 2007 at Strikeforce: Young Guns and lost via unanimous decision. He went on to compile a record of 6–2 before being signed by Bellator.

Bellator
Beltran made his Bellator debut at Bellator 5 on May 1, 2009 against former UFC fighter Sherman Pendergarst. Beltran won the fight in the first round via TKO.

In his next appearance, under the King of the Cage banner, Beltran defeated Wes Combs via TKO only 25 seconds into the fight.

Beltran would go 1–1 before picking up another TKO win over another UFC veteran, Houston Alexander, and was subsequently signed by the UFC.

Ultimate Fighting Championship
Beltran made his UFC debut at UFC 109 against Brazilian jiu-jitsu black belt, Rolles Gracie. Beltran was stepping in as a last minute replacement for Gracie's original opponent, Mostapha Al-turk. Beltran upset the fatigued Gracie and was victorious via a second round TKO.

Beltran returned to action on May 8, 2010 at UFC 113. He was originally set to fight Chad Corvin, but after Corvin's paperwork was not approved by the Quebec Athletic Commission he was pulled from the card and replaced by Tim Hague. Beltran defeated Hague after three rounds, taking the unanimous decision.

Beltran next faced Matt Mitrione on September 25, 2010 at UFC 119. Beltran fought and lost to Mitrione via unanimous decision. Even though he lost, he still earned Fight of the Night honors.

Beltran then fought highly regarded kickboxer Pat Barry at UFC Fight for the Troops 2 on January 22, 2011, in Fort Hood, Texas. He lost the fight via unanimous decision. During the fight, Beltran received a high volume of leg kicks from Barry, a former K-1 kickboxing competitor, yet only collapsed at the end of the final round. Barry has since expressed his bewilderment at the level of punishment that Beltran was able to absorb.

Beltran was expected to face promotional newcomer Dave Herman on June 11, 2011 at UFC 131. However, after Herman was shuffled to the main card, Beltran instead faced another UFC newcomer in Aaron Rosa. After a back-and-forth first two rounds, Beltran defeated Rosa via TKO in the third round.

Beltran fought Stipe Miocic on October 8, 2011 at UFC 136, losing via unanimous decision.

Beltran faced former Strikeforce heavyweight Lavar Johnson on January 28, 2012 at UFC on Fox: Evans vs. Davis, where he was knocked out for the first time in his career in the first round. Following the loss, Beltran was released from the promotion.

Post-UFC
After being released, Beltran announced that he would be dropping down to compete in the Light heavyweight division. He officially made his Light heavyweight debut on April 28, 2012 at C3 Fights in Oklahoma, where he defeated Anton Talamantes via unanimous decision.

Return to the UFC
Beltran made his return to the UFC replacing Brandon Vera against Australian James Te Huna on July 11, 2012 at UFC on Fuel TV 4. Although Beltran lost via unanimous decision, the back and forth bout earned Fight of the Night honors.

Beltran was expected to face Anthony Perosh on December 15, 2012 at UFC on FX 6. However, Perosh was forced from the bout with a toe injury and replaced by Igor Pokrajac. He won the fight via unanimous decision. On January 10, 2013, it was announced that Beltran had failed his post fight drug test, testing positive for nandrolone. Beltran was subsequently suspended for 9 months, retroactive to December 14, 2012. His win over Pokrajac was changed to a No Contest.

Returning from his suspension, Beltran faced Fábio Maldonado on October 9, 2013 at UFC Fight Night 29 in Maldonado's home-country of Brazil. He lost the back-and-forth fight via split decision. He was subsequently released from the promotion.

Return to Bellator
On October 30, 2013, it was announced that Beltran had signed with Bellator MMA.  He faced former UFC Light heavyweight Champion Quinton "Rampage" Jackson on November 15, 2013 in the main event at Bellator 108. He lost the fight via TKO in the first round.

Beltran faced Vladimir Matyushenko at Bellator 116 on April 11, 2014, winning by third round submission, his first submission win since 2007.

Bellator title shot
Beltran challenged Emanuel Newton for the Bellator Light heavyweight Championship at Bellator 124 on September 12, 2014. He lost the fight via knockout in the third round.

Drop down to middleweight
Beltran made his Middleweight debut against Brian Rogers on April 10, 2015 at Bellator 136. He won the fight by majority decision.

Beltran next faced Kendall Grove at Bellator 143 on September 25, 2015. He lost the fight via TKO in the third round.

On September 21, 2016, it was announced that Beltran would be facing Alessio Sakara in the co-main event of Bellator 168 on December 10, 2016. He lost via knockout in the first round. He was subsequently released from the promotion.

Post-Bellator and rehab
After the latest loss and release, Beltran succumbed into alcohol and drug addiction and entered rehabilitation. Having already essentially retired after his latest fight, Beltran was lured to face Sergei Kharitonov at Russian Cagefighting Championship 1 on February 25, 2018. He lost the fight via unanimous decision.

He would take yet another fight in the Russian circuit against Dmitry Tebekin at S-70 event on August 14, 2019, winning the fight via unanimous decision.

Bare knuckle boxing
After having problems with getting fights in the regional circuit, an opportunity presented itself to compete in bare-knuckle boxing. In his debut Beltran faced Tony Lopez - who he had twice previously lost to in MMA - at the inaugural Bare Knuckle FC event held on June 2, 2018. The bout also served as an alternate bout for the BKFC Heavyweight Tournament. He won the brutal back-and-forth fight via unanimous decision.

BKFC World Heavyweight Championship
At BKFC 9 Beltran won a unanimous decision victory over Chase Sherman, becoming the BKFC World Heavyweight Champion, as well as the National Police Gazette Heavyweight American Champion.

Beltran was expected to defend his title against Mark Godbeer at BKFC 12 on April 11, 2020. However, the whole event was postponed due to the COVID-19 pandemic and the bout was scrapped.

On October 10, 2020 at BKFC 13, Beltran became the first man to defend the BKFC World Heavyweight title by defeating former University of Alabama football linebacker Marcel Stamps via fourth round TKO. The outcome of this bout also resulted in Beltran retaining the Police Gazette Heavyweight World Championship, a title that had not been in the ring since 1899.

Beltran’s second defense of the BKFC World Heavyweight Championship at BKFC 18 was against Sam Shewmaker. He won the bout via unanimous decision.

Beltran's next defense of the BKFC World Heavyweight Championship was against former BKFC World Heavyweight Champion Arnold Adams in a rematch on November 6, 2021 at BKFC Fight Night: New York. He lost by unanimous decision, ending his reign as champion.

Post-championship reign
Beltran then faced Frank Tate at BKFC Fight Night: Ft. Lauderdale on April 21, 2022. He was knocked out just 23 seconds into the bout.

He then headlined BKFC 33 on November 18, 2022, against Houston Alexander in a rematch of their MMA bout in 2010. He lost the bout via second-round knockout. A month later, BKFC President Dave Feldman stated that Beltran would not fight for the company anymore.

Personal life
Beltran is married to the BKFC Women's Strawweight Champion Britain Hart.

Championships and accomplishments

Bare-knuckle boxing
Bare Knuckle Fighting Championship
BKFC World Heavyweight Champion (one time; former)
Two successful title defenses
 Police Gazette World Heavyweight Champion (one time; former)

Mixed martial arts
5150 Combat League / Xtreme Fighting League
5150 Combat League Heavyweight Championship (One time)
Ultimate Fighting Championship
Fight of the Night (Two times) vs. James Te Huna and Matt Mitrione

Mixed martial arts record

|-
| Win
| align=center| 18–15 (1)
| Dmitry Tebekin
| Decision (unanimous)
| S-70: Plotforma Cup 2019
| 
| align=center| 3
| align=center| 5:00
| Sochi, Russia
| 
|-
| Loss
| align=center| 17–15 (1)
| Sergei Kharitonov
| Decision (unanimous)
| Russian Cagefighting Championship
| 
| align=center| 3
| align=center| 5:00
| Yekaterinburg, Russia
|
|-
| Loss
| align=center| 17–14 (1)
| Alessio Sakara
| KO (punches)
| Bellator 168
| 
| align=center| 1
| align=center| 1:20
| Florence, Italy
|
|-
| Loss
| align=center| 17–13 (1)
| Chase Gormley
| Decision (split)
| Bellator 155
| 
| align=center| 3
| align=center| 5:00
| Boise, Idaho, United States
|
|-
| Win
| align=center| 17–12 (1)
| Lamont Stafford 
| TKO (punches)
| C3 Fights: Beltran vs Stafford
| 
| align=center| 1
| align=center| 4:14
| Newkirk, Oklahoma, United States
| 
|-
| Loss
| align=center| 16–12 (1)
| Kendall Grove
| TKO (punches)
| Bellator 143
| 
| align=center| 3
| align=center| 2:27
| Hidalgo, Texas, United States
|
|-
| Win
| align=center| 16–11 (1)
| Brian Rogers
| Decision (majority)
| Bellator 136
| 
| align=center| 3
| align=center| 5:00
| Irvine, California, United States
| 
|-
| Loss
| align=center| 15–11 (1)
| Emanuel Newton
| KO (spinning back fist)
| Bellator 124
| 
| align=center| 3
| align=center| 3:07
| Plymouth Township, Michigan, United States
| 
|-
| Win
| align=center| 15–10 (1)
| Vladimir Matyushenko
| Submission (north-south choke)
| Bellator 116
| 
| align=center| 3
| align=center| 3:06
| Temecula, California, United States
| 
|-
| Loss
| align=center| 14–10 (1)
| Quinton Jackson
| KO (punches)
| Bellator 108
| 
| align=center| 1
| align=center| 4:59
| Atlantic City, New Jersey, United States
| 
|-
| Loss
| align=center| 14–9 (1)
| Fábio Maldonado
| Decision (split)
| UFC Fight Night: Maia vs. Shields
| 
| align=center| 3
| align=center| 5:00
| Barueri, Brazil
| 
|-
| NC
| align=center| 14–8 (1)
| Igor Pokrajac
| NC (overturned)
| UFC on FX: Sotiropoulos vs. Pearson
| 
| align=center| 3
| align=center| 5:00
| Gold Coast, Australia
| 
|-
| Loss
| align=center| 14–8
| James Te Huna
| Decision (unanimous)
| UFC on Fuel TV: Munoz vs. Weidman
| 
| align=center| 3
| align=center| 5:00
| San Jose, California, United States
| 
|-
| Win
| align=center| 14–7
| Anton Talamantes
| Decision (unanimous)
| C3 Fights
| 
| align=center| 3
| align=center| 5:00
| Newkirk, Oklahoma, United States
| 
|-
| Loss
| align=center| 13–7
| Lavar Johnson
| KO (punches)
| UFC on Fox: Evans vs. Davis
| 
| align=center| 1
| align=center| 4:24
| Chicago, Illinois, United States
| 
|-
| Loss
| align=center| 13–6
| Stipe Miocic
| Decision (unanimous)
| UFC 136
| 
| align=center| 3
| align=center| 5:00
| Houston, Texas, United States
| 
|-
| Win
| align=center| 13–5
| Aaron Rosa
| TKO (punches)
| UFC 131
| 
| align=center| 3
| align=center| 1:26
| Vancouver, British Columbia, Canada
| 
|-
| Loss
| align=center| 12–5
| Pat Barry
| Decision (unanimous)
| UFC: Fight For The Troops 2
| 
| align=center| 3
| align=center| 5:00
| Fort Hood, Texas, United States
| 
|-
| Loss
| align=center| 12–4
| Matt Mitrione
| Decision (unanimous)
| UFC 119
| 
| align=center| 3
| align=center| 5:00
| Indianapolis, Indiana, United States
| 
|-
| Win
| align=center| 12–3
| Tim Hague
| Decision (unanimous)
| UFC 113
| 
| align=center| 3
| align=center| 5:00
| Montreal, Quebec, Canada
| 
|-
| Win
| align=center| 11–3
| Rolles Gracie Jr.
| TKO (punches)
| UFC 109
| 
| align=center| 2
| align=center| 1:31
| Las Vegas, Nevada, United States
| 
|-
| Win
| align=center| 10–3
| Houston Alexander
| TKO (punches)
| 5150 Combat League / Xtreme Fighting League: New Year's Revolution
| 
| align=center| 2
| align=center| 3:49
| Tulsa, Oklahoma, United States
| 
|-
| Loss
| align=center| 9–3
| Tony Lopez
| Decision (unanimous)
| KOTC: Distorted
| 
| align=center| 5
| align=center| 5:00
| Highland, California, United States
| 
|-
| Win
| align=center| 9–2
| Tracy Willis
| TKO (punches and elbows)
| 5150 Combat League: Rumble at the Rally
| 
| align=center| 1
| align=center| 3:33
| Sparks, Oklahoma, United States
| 
|-
| Win
| align=center| 8–2
| Wes Combs
| TKO (punches)
| KOTC: Legends
| 
| align=center| 1
| align=center| 0:25
| Winterhaven, California, United States
| 
|-
| Win
| align=center| 7–2
| Sherman Pendergarst
| TKO (punches)
| Bellator 5
| 
| align=center| 1
| align=center| 2:24
| Dayton, Ohio, United States
| 
|-
| Win
| align=center| 6–2
| Jacob Browy
| TKO (punches)
| Gladiator Challenge: Warriors
| 
| align=center| 1
| align=center| 1:20
| Pauma Valley, California, United States
| 
|-
| Win
| align=center| 5–2
| Wes Fenton
| TKO (punches)
| Total Combat 32
| 
| align=center| 1
| align=center| 2:15
| El Cajon, California, United States
| 
|-
| Loss
| align=center| 4–2
| Tony Lopez
| Submission (kimura)
| KOTC: Opposing Force
| 
| align=center| 1
| align=center| 3:15
| Highland, California, United States
| 
|-
| Win
| align=center| 4–1
| Phil Friedman
| TKO (punches)
| Total Combat 28
| 
| align=center| 1
| align=center| 0:50
| San Diego, California, United States
| 
|-
| Win
| align=center| 3–1
| Ray Seraile
| TKO (punches)
| TC 25: Fight Club
| 
| align=center| 2
| align=center| 0:56
| San Diego, California, United States
| 
|-
| Win
| align=center| 2–1
| Tony Velarde
| Submission (kimura)
| Total Combat 21
| 
| align=center| 1
| align=center| 2:35
| San Diego, California, United States
| 
|-
| Win
| align=center| 1–1
| Paul Ingrassia
| TKO (punches)
| Total Combat 20
| 
| align=center| 1
| align=center| 2:54
| San Diego, California, United States
| 
|-
| Loss
| align=center| 0–1
| Yohan Banks
| Decision (unanimous)
| Strikeforce: Young Guns
| 
| align=center| 3
| align=center| 3:00
| San Jose, California, United States
|

Bare knuckle record

|-
|Loss
|align=center|5–4–1
|Houston Alexander
|KO (punches)
|BKFC 33
|
|align=center|2
|align=center|0:38
|Omaha, Nebraska, United States
|
|-
|Loss
|align=center|5–3–1
|Frank Tate
|KO (punches)
|BKFC Fight Night: Ft. Lauderdale
| 
|align=center|1
|align=center|0:23
|Fort Lauderdale, Florida, United States
|
|-
|Loss
|align=center|5–2–1
|Arnold Adams
|Decision (unanimous)
|BKFC Fight Night: New York
| 
|align=center|5
|align=center|2:00
|Salamanca, New York, United States
|
|-
|Win
|align=center|5–1–1
|Sam Shewmaker
|Decision (unanimous)
|BKFC 18: Beltran vs. Shewmaker
| 
|align=center|5
|align=center|2:00
|Miami, Florida, United States
|
|-
|Win
|align=center|4–1–1
|Marcel Stamps
|KO (punches)
|BKFC 13: Beltran vs. Stamps
| 
|align=center|4
|align=center|1:55
|Salina, Kansas, United States
|
|-
|Win
|align=center|3–1–1
|Chase Sherman
|Decision (unanimous)
|BKFC 9: Lobov vs. Knight 2 
|
|align=center|5
|align=center|2:00
|Biloxi, Mississippi, United States
|
|-
|Win
|align=center|2–1–1
|Jamie Campbell
|TKO (punches) 
|BKFC 6: Malignaggi vs. Lobov
|
|align=center|2
|align=center|1:50
|Tampa, Florida, United States
|
|- 
|Draw
|align=center|1–1–1
|Tony Lopez
|Draw (split)
|BKFC 4: USA vs. Mexico
|
|align=center|5
|align=center|2:00
|Cancun, Mexico
|
|- 
|Loss
|align=center|1–1
|Arnold Adams
|TKO (doctor stoppage)
||BKFC 2: A New Era
|
|align=center|4
|align=center|0:09
|Biloxi, Mississippi, United States
|
|- 
|Win
|align=center|1–0
|Tony Lopez
|Decision (unanimous)
|BKFC 1: The Beginning
|
|align=center|5
|align=center|2:00
|Cheyenne, Wyoming, United States
|
|-

See also
List of male mixed martial artists
List of Brazilian jiu-jitsu practitioners
List of current Bellator fighters

References

External links

Official UFC Profile

1981 births
American male mixed martial artists
American mixed martial artists of Mexican descent
American sportspeople in doping cases
Doping cases in mixed martial arts
Mixed martial artists from California
Heavyweight mixed martial artists
Mixed martial artists utilizing boxing
Mixed martial artists utilizing Brazilian jiu-jitsu
Mixed martial artists utilizing Greco-Roman wrestling
Ultimate Fighting Championship male fighters
American male boxers
American boxers of Mexican descent
Bare-knuckle boxers
Boxers from San Diego
American male sport wrestlers
Amateur wrestlers
American practitioners of Brazilian jiu-jitsu
Sportspeople from Carlsbad, California
University of Hawaiʻi at Mānoa alumni
People from Oceanside, California
Living people